Eurostat ('European Statistical Office'; DG ESTAT) is a Directorate-General of the European Commission located in the Kirchberg quarter of Luxembourg City, Luxembourg. Eurostat's main responsibilities are to provide statistical information to the institutions of the European Union (EU) and to promote the harmonisation of statistical methods across its member states and candidates for accession as well as EFTA countries. The organisations in the different countries that cooperate with Eurostat are summarised under the concept of the European Statistical System.

Organisation
Eurostat operates pursuant to Regulation (EC) No 223/2009. Since the swearing in of the von der Leyen Commission in December 2019, Eurostat is allocated to the portfolio of the European Commissioner for the Economy, Paolo Gentiloni.

The Director-General of Eurostat is Mariana Kotzeva, former Deputy Director-General of Eurostat and President of the National Statistical Institute of Bulgaria.

History

 1953 The Statistics Division for the European Coal and Steel Community established.
 1958 The European Community founded and the forerunner of Eurostat established.
 1959 The present name of Eurostat as the Statistical Office of the European Communities adopted. First publication issued - on agricultural statistics.
 1960 First Community Labour Force Survey.
 1970 The European System of Integrated Economic Accounts (European System of Accounts, ESA) published and the general Statistical Classification of Economic Activities in the European Community (NACE) established.
 1974 First domain in the statistical database Cronos databank installed.
 1988 European Commission adopts a document defining the first policy for statistical information.
 1989 The Statistical Programme Committee established and the first programme (1989–1992) adopted by the council as an instrument for implementing statistical information policy.
 1990 The Council adopts a directive on transmission of confidential data to Eurostat, previously an obstacle to Community statistical work.
 1991 Eurostat's role extended as a result of the agreement on establishment of the European Economic Area and adoption of the Maastricht Treaty.
 1993 The single market extends Eurostat's activities e.g. Intrastat established for statistics on intra-EU trade. Eurostat starts issuing regular news releases.
 1994 First European household panel held, analysing income, employment, poverty, social exclusion, households, health, etc.
 1997 Statistics added for the first time to the Treaty of Amsterdam and the Statistical Law approved by the council. Harmonised Indices of Consumer Prices HICP published for the first time - designed for Economic and Monetary Union of the European Union (EMU) convergence criteria.
 1998 The eleven countries in at the start of EMU (EUR-11) announced, and Eurostat issues the first indicators specific to the EMU area.
 1999 Start of EMU, 1 January 2001.
 2001 In April, Eurostat, in collaboration with five other international organisations (APEC, IAE, OLADE, OPEC, UNSD) launched the Joint Oil Data Exercise, which in 2005 became the Joint Organisations Data Initiative (JODI).
 2002 Start of the Euro on 1 January, Eurostat supplies key statistics for monetary policy.
 2003 Irregularities were suspected in Eurostat, see Eurostat scandal.
 2004 Start of free-of-charge dissemination of all statistical data except microdata for research purposes.
 2005 Commission Recommendation on the independence, integrity and Accountability of the National and Community Statistical Authorities (European Statistics Code of Practice)
 2005 Start of a three-year peer review exercise across the European Statistical System to monitor compliance with the Code of Practice.
 2007 The currently valid five-year Statistical Programme 2008-2012 was adopted.
 2009 New European Regulation governing statistical cooperation in the European Union was adopted.
 2010 Following strong criticism, from within the EU and otherwise, of how it had handled inaccurate data regarding Greece, Eurostat published a report to try to rectify its procedures. The European Commission proposes powers for Eurostat to audit the books of national governments in response to the Greek government-debt crisis.
 2011 Revision of European Statistics Code of Practice by the European Statistical System Committee.

Directors General

Regulations

The Regulation (EC) No 223/2009 of the European Parliament and of the Council of 11 March 2009 on European statistics establishes the legal framework for the European statistics.

Amending Regulation (EU) 759/2015 clarifies that heads of NSIs coordinate national level activities for European statistics and decide on processes, methods, standards and procedures of their respective statistics.

Previous Eurostat regulations were a Decision on Eurostat (2012/504/EU), and the earlier Decision on Eurostat (97/281/EC).

Main areas of statistical activities

European regions by GDP, expressed as a percentage of the EU average

Statistical work
The Eurostat statistical work is structured into Themes and Sub-themes.

General and regional statistics
 Regions and cities
 Land cover/use statistics (LUCAS)
 International cooperation

Economy and finance
 National accounts (including GDP)
 ESA Input-Output tables
 European sector accounts
 Pensions in National Accounts
 Government finance and EDP
 Exchange and interest rates
 Harmonised Indices of Consumer Prices (HICP)
 Housing price statistics
 Purchasing Power Parities (PPPs)
 Balance of payments
 Economic globalisation

Population and social conditions
 Population: demography, population projections, census, asylum & migration
 Health
 Education and training
 Labour market (including Labour Force Survey (LFS))
 Income, social inclusion and living conditions
 Social protection
 Household Budget Surveys
 Youth
 Culture
 Sport
 Crime and criminal justice
 Quality of life indicators
 Equality (age, gender and disability)
 Skills related statistics

Industry, trade and services
 Structural business statistics
 Short-term business statistics
 Tourism
 Manufactured goods (Prodcom)

Agriculture and fisheries
 Agriculture
 Forestry
 Fisheries

International trade
 International trade in goods
 International trade in services

Transport

Environment and energy
 Environment
 Energy
 Climate change

Science, technology, digital society
 Science, technology and innovation
 Digital economy and society

General statistical activities
General statistical activities related to the European Statistical system are:
 Coordination and governance of the European Statistical System
 Statistical methodological coordination and research
 Statistical quality and reporting

Geographical scope
EU data
Currently, and since Brexit on February the first 2020, Eurostat data are aggregated at the EU-27 level, known as EU-27.
Before Brexit Eurostat data was aggregated at the EU-28 level, known as EU-28.

Since Brexit occurred on February the first 2020, data has to be computed for the EU-27 because by definition Brexit makes the UK a third country to the EU.

Nonetheless, to avoid confusion with the previous EU-27 group of 27 member states — which was used in the series of statistical data before the accession of member state number 28 —  another name for the current EU 27 without the UK is defined as EU27_2019 in February 2019 and EU27_2020 since March 2020 according to Eurostat

The name changed from EU27_2019 to EU27_2020 due to a British constitutional delay which resulted in Brexit being delivered in 2020 rather than the initially planned 2019.

The concept of the EU 28 has been used since 1 January 2014, also according to the Eurostat methodological manual on city statistics, 2017 edition.

Local data are also computed at the NUTS level.

 Statistical cooperation in and around Europe
Eurostat is also engaged in cooperation with third countries through the European Statistical System, Enlargement Policy, and European Neighbourhood Policy.

In 2021, European Statistical System includes 4 EFTA countries, that is 3 EEA countries and Switzerland.

EU Enlargement Policy  includes "candidate countries" in the process of joining the EU and other potential candidates.

In 2021, European Neighbourhood Policy covers 16 countries such as 6 ENP-East countries — Armenia, Azerbaijan, Belarus, Georgia, Moldova and Ukraine — and 10 ENP-South countries — Algeria, Egypt, Israel, Jordan, Lebanon, Libya, Morocco, Palestine, Syria and Tunisia.

The trade and cooperation agreement between the European Union and the United Kingdom  — since  1 January 2021 — includes a provision on statistical cooperation that foresees the establishment of a specific future arrangement.

Access to Eurostat statistics
The most important statistics are made available via press releases. They are placed on the Eurostat website at 11:00 in the morning. This is also the time that the press release content may be distributed to the public by press agencies.

Eurostat disseminates its statistics free of charge via its Internet and its statistical databases that are accessible via the Internet. The statistics are hierarchically ordered in a navigation tree. Tables are distinguished from multi-dimensional datasets from which the statistics are extracted via an interactive tool.

In addition various printed publications are available either in electronic form free on the internet or in printed form via the EU Bookshop. Only larger publications are charged for as printed copies.

Since September 2009 Eurostat has pioneered a fully electronical way of publishing, Statistics Explained, like Wikipedia based on Mediawiki open source software and with a largely similar structure and navigation. Statistics Explained is not only a dissemination format, however, but also a wiki working platform for producing flagship publications like the Eurostat Yearbook.

Statistical data for research purposes
Microdata, which in principle allows the identification of the statistical unit (e.g., a person in the labour force survey or a company for innovation statistics), is treated as strictly confidential. Under tight security procedures various anonymised datasets are provided to research institutions for validated research projects.

Location
Eurostat has been based in the Joseph Bech building, in the northeast of the Kirchberg quarter of Luxembourg City, since the building was opened in 1998. The Directorate-General will relocate to the Jean Monnet 2 building, in the Kirchberg's European district, following the completion of the first phase of the building, expected in February 2023.

See also
European Commissioner for Economy
EU Open Data Portal
Eurobarometer
European Forum for GeoStatistics
Larger urban zone

References

External links

Eurostat Statistics explained - a wiki-based encyclopaedia / glossary / portal for EU statistics
EU Open Data Portal 
Health-EU Portal - The official public health portal of the European Union
Matlab Eurostat data downloading facility - An automated data importing tool from Eurostat to Matlab

General Services in the European Commission
European Union organisations based in Luxembourg
Statistical organizations